Plachta is a surname. Notable people with the surname include:
 Jindřich Plachta (1899–1951), Czech actor
 Matthias Plachta (born 1991), German ice hockey player

See also
 

Czech-language surnames